George Wyatt (1554–1624) from Allington Castle was an English sixteenth-century writer and politician. He was the first biographer of Henry VIII's second queen, Anne Boleyn. His grandfather Sir Thomas Wyatt the Elder, was a famous poet, as well as a cousin and early admirer of Anne's.

He was the son of Thomas Wyatt the younger, who led the unsuccessful Wyatt's rebellion in 1554 and his wife Jane Haute.

He married Jane Finch (circa 1560–1644), the daughter of Sir Thomas Finch, 8 October 1582, at Eastwell, Kent. Their children included Sir Francis Wyatt, the Governor of Virginia, and Reverend Haute Wyatt (1594–1638), who was minister at Jamestown, Virginia.

References

16th-century English writers
16th-century male writers
17th-century English writers
17th-century English male writers
George
English biographers
1624 deaths
1553 births
People from Allington, Kent